K.P. Bhaskar (1925 – 17 April 2013) was an Indian classical dance instructor and maestro. He was born in Kerala, India in 1925 and died at age 88 on 17 April 2013 following a heart illness.

References

Teachers of Indian classical dance
2013 deaths
1925 births
Dancers from Kerala